Ruperto is a masculine given name. Notable people with the name include:

José Ruperto Monagas (1831–1880), elected President of Venezuela 1869–1870
Ruperto Alaura, Cebuano writer
Ruperto Biete (1906–1929), Spanish boxer
Ruperto Chapí (1851–1909), Spanish composer, and co-founder of the Sociedad General de Autores
Ruperto Herrera Tabio (born 1949), former basketball player from Cuba
Ruperto Kangleon, Filipino military figure and politician

See also
353 Ruperto-Carola, small Main belt asteroid
Rupert (disambiguation)

Masculine given names